Eilao is one of five parishes in Illano, a municipality within the province and autonomous community of Asturias, in northern Spain. 

The population is 364. The postal code is 33734.

Villages
 Cachafol
 Carbayal
 Cimadevilla
 Enterríos
 Eilao (capital)
 A Montaña
 Pastur
 Santesteba
 Vilar
 Vilaseca
 Zadamoño

References

Parishes in Illano